{{DISPLAYTITLE:Omega2 Scorpii}}

ω2 Scorpii, Latinised as Omega2 Scorpii, is a suspected variable star in the zodiac constellation of Scorpius. A component of the visual double star ω Scorpii, it is bright enough to be seen with the naked eye having an apparent visual magnitude of +4.320. The distance to this star, as determined using parallax measurements, is around 291 light years. The visual magnitude of this star is reduced by 0.38 because of extinction from interstellar dust.

It is 0.05 degree north of the ecliptic, so can be occulted by the moon and planets.

This is a G-type giant star with a stellar classification of G6/8III. With an estimated age of 282 million years, it is an evolved, thin disk star that is currently on the red horizontal branch. It has 3.27 times the mass of the Sun, and radiates 141 times the Sun's luminosity The effective temperature of the star's outer atmosphere is 5,363 K.

Names
In the Cook Islands, a traditional story is told of twins who flee their parents into the sky and become the pair of stars Omega2 and Omega1 Scorpii. The girl, who is called Piri-ere-ua "Inseparable", keeps tight hold of her brother, who is not named. (The IAU used a version of this story from Tahiti to name Mu2 Scorpii.)

References

External links

G-type giants
Upper Scorpius
Scorpius (constellation)
Scorpii, Omega-1
Scorpii, 10
78990
5997
144608
Durchmusterung objects
Suspected variables
Piri-ere-ua